Lee Je-Kyu (born 10 July 1986) is a South Korean football player who plays for Mokpo City.

External links 
 

1986 births
Living people
Association football forwards
South Korean footballers
Daejeon Hana Citizen FC players
Gimcheon Sangmu FC players
Suwon Samsung Bluewings players
K League 1 players
Korea National League players